Toncho Dimitrov Tonchev (born December 1, 1972 in Sliven) is a Bulgarian boxer, who won the Lightweight Silver medal at the 1996 Summer Olympics. Tontchev also represented his native country at the 1992 Summer Olympics in Barcelona, Spain.

Amateur career

Olympic results 

In 1996 he won the silver medal at the European Amateur Boxing Championships in Vejle, Denmark. Tontchev turned professional in 1997.

Professional boxing record

References

External links
 
 

1972 births
Living people
Sportspeople from Sliven
Boxers at the 1992 Summer Olympics
Boxers at the 1996 Summer Olympics
Olympic boxers of Bulgaria
Olympic silver medalists for Bulgaria
Olympic medalists in boxing
Bulgarian male boxers
Medalists at the 1996 Summer Olympics
Lightweight boxers